Sia (born 1975) is an Australian singer and songwriter.

Sia or SIA may also refer to:

Organizations
 Secret Intelligence Australia, a British World War II intelligence unit
 Security Industry Association, for makers and handlers of electronic and physical security products
 Security Industry Authority, a British licensing authority for the private-security industry
 Securities Industry Association, in finance
 Semiconductor Industry Association
 Smithsonian Institution Archives
 Societe Internationale d’Acupuncture, a defunct French research organization
 Society for Industrial Archeology, a North American nonprofit organization
 Solidaridad Internacional Antifascista, a Spanish anarchist humanitarian organisation that existed during the Spanish Civil War
 Staten Island Academy, a US school
 Survivors of Incest Anonymous
 , the French Aeronautical Information Service

Businesses
 Service in Informatics and Analysis, provided batch and remote terminal access to mainframe computers, from 1967 to the early 1990s
 SIA Ltd, suppliers of geographic information software and services
 SOCO International (London stock exchange symbol SIA), an international oil and gas exploration and production company
 Sia Partners, a management consulting firm
 SIA S.p.A., an Italian information and communications technology company

Transportation
 Società Italiana Aviazione, a subsidiary of Fiat that built aircraft and aero engines between 1914 and 1918
 Subaru of Indiana Automotive, Inc., formerly Subaru-Isuzu Automotive, Inc.
 Seychelles International Airways, a former charter airline
 Singapore Airlines (ICAO code: SIA)

Places
 Sia (Pisidia), a town of ancient Pisidia, now in Turkey
 Sia, Cyprus, a village
 Sia, an ancient pieve (church with a baptistery) in Corsica
 Sangster International Airport, Jamaica
 Xi'an Xiguan Airport (IATA code: SIA)

People
 Sia Berkeley (born 1985), English actress
 Sia Figiel (born 1967), Samoan novelist, poet and painter
 Sia Koroma (born 1958), Sierra Leonean biochemist and psychiatric nurse; wife of Sierra Leonean President Ernest Bai Koroma
 Beau Sia (born 1976), American slam poet
 Edgar Sia (born 1977), Filipino billionaire property developer

Other uses
 Sia (god), a deification of wisdom in Egyptian mythology
 Sia (insect), a genus of insect
 Self-indication assumption, a philosophical principle
 Social impact assessment, a methodology
 Sia (title), a hereditary title in colonial Indonesia
 Style Icon Asia, formerly Style Icon Awards, an awards ceremony

See also

 Security Intelligence Agency (BIA), a Serbian government intelligence agency
 Zia (disambiguation)
 Zia Pueblo, New Mexico, US